D'Antoni is an Italian surname. It derived from the Antonius root name. Notable people with the surname include:

Alessandro D'Antoni (born 1988), Italian footballer
Andrea D'Antoni (1811–1868), Italian painter
Antonio D'Antoni (1801–1859), Italian opera composer and conductor
Dan D'Antoni (born 1947), Italian-American basketball coach and former player, brother of Mike D'Antoni
David D'Antoni (born 1979), Italian footballer
Mike D'Antoni (born 1951), Italian-American NBA basketball coach and former player, brother of Dan D'Antoni
Philip D'Antoni (born 1929), American film producer

See also
D'Antona
Deantoni Parks, musician
D'Antonio, Italian surname

References

Italian-language surnames
Patronymic surnames
Surnames from given names